Hyundai Group is a South Korean conglomerate founded by Chung Ju-yung. The first company in the group was founded in 1947 as a construction company. With government assistance, Chung and his family members rapidly expanded into various industries, eventually becoming South Korea's second chaebol.  Chung Ju-yung was directly in control of the company until his death in 2001.

The company spun off many of its better known businesses after the 1997 Asian financial crisis and founder Chung Ju-yung's death, including Hyundai Motor Group,  Hyundai Department Store Group, and Hyundai Heavy Industries Group. The Hyundai Group now focuses on elevators and tourism to Mount Kumgang.

Etymology
The name "Hyundai" comes from the Korean word  (hanja form), which means "modernity".

History 

 In 1947, Hyundai Togun (Hyundai Engineering and Construction), the initial company of the Hyundai Group, was established by Chung Ju-yung. Hyundai Construction began operating outside of South Korea in 1965, initially entering the markets of Guam, Thailand and Vietnam. In 1950, Hyundai Togun was renamed Hyundai Construction. In 1958, Keumkang Company was established to make construction materials. In 1965, Hyundai Construction began its first overseas venture, a highway project in Thailand.
 In 1967, Hyundai Motors was established. Hyundai Heavy Industries was founded in 1973, and completed the construction of its first ships in June 1974.
 In 1975, the group begins construction on an integrated car factory and launches a new Korean vehicle.
 In 1973, the group's shipyard is incorporated as Hyundai Shipbuilding and Heavy Industries, renamed Hyundai Heavy Industries in 1978.
 In 1976, Hyundai Corporation is established as a trading arm. The same year, Asia Merchant Marine Co. established, later renamed Hyundai Merchant Marine.
 In 1977, Asan Foundation was established.
 In 1983 Hyundai entered the semiconductor industry through the establishment of Hyundai Electronics (renamed Hynix in 2001).
 In 1986, Hyundai Research Institute was established.
 In 1986 a Hyundai-manufactured IBM PC-XT compatible called the Blue Chip PC was sold in discount and toy stores throughout the US. It was one of the earliest PC clones marketed toward consumers instead of business.
 In 1988, Asian Sangsun was established, renamed Hyundai Logistics in 1992.
 By the mid-1990s Hyundai comprised over 60 subsidiary companies and was active in a diverse range of activities including automobile manufacturing, construction, chemicals, electronics, financial services, heavy industry and shipbuilding. In the same period it had total annual revenues of around US$90 billion and over 200,000 employees.
 In December 1995, Hyundai announced a major management restructuring, affecting 404 executives.
 During 1997 Asian financial crisis, Hyundai acquired Kia Motors and LG Semi-Conductor.
 In 1998, Korea's economic crisis forced the group to begin restructuring efforts, which include selling off subsidiaries and focusing on five core business areas. Nevertheless, Hyundai began South Korean tourism to North Korea's Kumgangsan. In 1999, Hyundai Asan was established to operating Kumgang tourism, the Kaesong Industrial Complex, and other inter-Korean work.
 In April 1999 Hyundai announced an enormous corporate restructuring, involving a two-thirds reduction of the number of business units and a plan to break up the group into five independent business groups by 2003.
 In 2001, the founder Chung Ju-yung died, and the Hyundai Group conglomerate continued to be dismantled.
 In 2007, Hyundai Construction Equipment India Pvt. Ltd. established in India.
 In 2010, Hyundai Group was selected as a preferred bidder by creditors for the acquisition of Hyundai Engineering & Construction.

Logo

Affiliated companies 
As of 2017, these are the affiliated companies of the Hyundai Group.

 Hyundai Elevator
 Hyundai Movex
 Hyundai Asan
 Hyundai Research Institute
 Hyundai Investment Partners
 Hyundai Global
 Able Hyundai Hotel & Resort
 Bloomvista

Hyundai Motor Company 

Hyundai branded vehicles are manufactured by Hyundai Motor Company, which along with Kia forms the Hyundai Kia Automotive Group. Headquartered in Seoul, South Korea, Hyundai operates in Ulsan the world's largest integrated automobile manufacturing facility, which is capable of producing 1.6 million units annually. The company employs about 75,000 people around the world. Hyundai vehicles are sold in 193 countries through some 6,000 dealerships and showrooms worldwide. In 2012, Hyundai sold over 4.4 million vehicles worldwide. Popular models include the Sonata and Elantra mid-sized sedans.

The Asan Foundation, established by Chung Ju-yung in 1977 with 50 percent of the stock of Hyundai Construction, subsidizes medical services in Korea primarily through the Asan Medical Center and six other hospitals. The foundation has sponsored conferences on Eastern ethics and funded academic research into traditional Korean culture. In 1991, it established the annual Filial Piety Award.

See also

 Economy of South Korea
 Chaebol
 Hyundai Motor Company

References

External links 

 Hyundai Group  Website
 Hyundai Group  Homepage
 Funding Universe profile
 Hyundai Power Equipment (UK)

 
Conglomerate companies of South Korea
Manufacturing companies of South Korea
Conglomerate companies established in 1947
South Korean companies established in 1947
Hyundai
Companies based in Seoul
Electronics companies of South Korea
Manufacturing companies established in 1947
Vehicle manufacturing companies established in 1947
South Korean brands